This is a list of locations where busking is known to happen on a regular basis.

Americas

United States

Central U.S.
 Minneapolis, Minnesota: Nicollet Mall, Hennepin Ave (downtown), any of the co-ops. Buskers often appear at the Mall of America and the skyways, but may be asked to leave.
 Boulder, Colorado: Pearl Street Mall
 Chicago: Busking is allowed at several places:
The Chicago Transit Authority currently only allows street performers to pitch at four stations; Jackson/State on the Red Line, Washington/State on the Red Line, Jackson/Dearborn on the Blue Line, and Washington/Dearborn on the Blue Line
Maxwell Street: This locale was featured in the Blues Brothers movie and has been the place of convergence for blues musicians since the 1930s.
Michigan Avenue ("Magnificent Mile")
 Decatur, Illinois: Saturday Produce Market, Richland Community College, June - September
 Kansas City, Missouri: The Plaza, Westport and the City Market
 Wichita, Kansas: Old Town and entire downtown area
 New Orleans, Louisiana: The French Quarter and the entire city in general
 Cincinnati, Ohio: The entire city, especially Over-the-Rhine and downtown, Findlay Market, and Clifton, where the bands Plastic Inevitables and Tillers started their careers
 Nashville, Tennessee: 2nd Avenue and Broadway
 Austin, Texas: 6th Street
 Tulsa, Oklahoma: Brady Arts District, Blue Dome
 Dallas, Texas: Deep Ellum
 St. Louis, Missouri: Delmar Loop
 Houston, Texas: Montrose District
 Madison, Wisconsin: State Street
 Indianapolis, Indiana: Washington Street downtown; Broad Ripple Avenue

East Coast
 Asheville, North Carolina: downtown area
 Washington, D.C.: Washington Metro
 Burlington, Vermont: Church Street Marketplace
 Portland, Maine: Monument Square
 St. Petersburg, Florida: The Pier and other locations in the downtown area
 Key West, Florida: Mallory Square
 Miami Beach, Florida: South Beach
 Fort Lauderdale, Florida: Riverwalk
 St. Augustine, Florida: downtown areas; 50 ft East or West from St. George Street on most cross-streets with the exception of Hypolita Street
 Atlanta, Georgia: Little Five Points
 Athens, Georgia: College Avenue
 Savannah, Georgia: River Street
 Boston, Massachusetts: Faneuil Hall
 Cambridge, Massachusetts: Harvard Square
 New York City, New York: New York City Subway; Battery, Central, and Washington Square Parks
 Baltimore, Maryland: Harborplace
 Philadelphia, Pennsylvania: near the tourist and historical sections
 Pittsburgh, Pennsylvania: Roberto Clemente Bridge on 6th Street, South Side along the Monongahela River, Pittsburgh Public Market at 2100 Smallman Street, Mt. Washington, Steel Plaza - Downtown, and Squirrel Hill

West Coast
 Los Angeles, California: Venice Beach Boardwalk, Hollywood (especially Grauman's Chinese Theater, Santa Monica Pier and Third Street Promenade)
 San Francisco, California: Fisherman's Wharf and Market Street and the whole city in general
 Oakland, California: Art Murmur and the whole city in general
 Santa Barbara, California: State Street
 Santa Cruz, California: Pacific Garden Mall and the beach area
 Santa Monica, California: Third Street Promenade outdoor mall
 Honolulu, Hawaii: Waikīkī
 Portland, Oregon: Portland Saturday Market
 Seattle, Washington: Seattle Center and Pike Place Market
 Las Vegas Strip
 San Diego, California: Seaport Village, Gaslamp Quarter, The Embarcadero, and Balboa Park

Canada
 Halifax, Nova Scotia: Halifax Waterfront, site of the Halifax International Busker Festival
 Kingston, Ontario: Ontario Street, site of the Kingston International Buskers Rendezvous
 Montréal, Québec: Rue Sainte-Catherine, most Métro stations, Place-des-Arts, Vieux Montréal (Place Jacques-Cartier, Vieux Port)
 Ottawa, Ontario: Sparks Street, Byward Market (both require costly licences), site of the Ottawa International Buskers Festival (though local buskers are not permitted to participate), heavy foot traffic area in the Byward Market, foot traffic between 11am-2pm weekdays and during festivals on Sparks Street. Queen and Bank Streets and Wellington in front of the Parliament buildings are licence free and have excellent foot traffic.
 Regina, Saskatchewan: Scarth Street
 Saskatoon, Saskatchewan: Broadway (downtown)
 Toronto, Ontario: Eaton Centre (illegal weekdays from 9am-12pm and 2pm to 5pm), both by Dundas Street and Queen Street; Kensington Market, St Lawrence Market, any street corner with a $40 license
 Vancouver, British Columbia: Granville Island, Granville Mall, in front of downtown SkyTrain Stations
 Victoria, British Columbia: waterfront of the downtown Inner Harbour
 Winnipeg, Manitoba: The Forks

Asia

China
 Beijing: Beijing Subway
 Qiqihar, Heilongjiang: the lakeshore at Qiqihar University campus, by English majors throughout the city

Iran 

 Tajrish Square, Tehran

Taiwan
 Xinyi Place, Shin Kong Mitsukoshi, Taipei, a shopping plaza

Europe

United Kingdom

England

 London: Covent Garden, Piccadilly Circus, London Underground, South Bank
 Bath, Somerset
 York
 Stratford-on-Avon
 Chester
 Birmingham: New Street, Victoria Square
 Truro: Pydar Street, High Cross
 Newcastle upon Tyne: Northumberland Street
 Brighton
 Bristol: Broadmead

Scotland

 Edinburgh: Edinburgh Festival Fringe, where street performers can perform at one of three allocated spots on the Royal Mile and at busking competitions

Netherlands

 Amsterdam: Leidseplein and Vondelpark

Germany

 Berlin: Alexanderplatz, Friedrichsbrücke leading to Museumsinsel, various underground stations, increasingly on underground trains
 Cologne: Domplatte, Hohe Straße, Schildergasse

Belgium

 Brussels: Boterstraat
 Antwerp: Groenplaats

Spain

 Barcelona: La Rambla
 Madrid: Puerta del Sol
 Madrid: Parque del Buen Retiro

Republic of Ireland

 Dublin: Grafton Street, Temple Bar, Mary Street/Henry Street
 Galway: Shop Street including Eyre Square and the Spanish Arch
 Kilkenny: Kieran Street
 Mayo Westport: Main Street

Poland

 Kraków: Main Market Square, Kraków, coronation route and surrounding streets
 Lublin: Kraków Gate, Promenade
 Wroclaw: Rynek, Ostrow Tumski
 Poznań: Rynek, Pójwiejska Street, Rondo Kaponiera

France

 Paris: Montmartre, Notre Dame de Paris (Parvis)

Greece

 Athens: Ermou Street, Monastiraki, Nea Smirni
 Thessaloniki: Navarinou square

Norway

 Oslo: Karl Johans gate

Italy
 Bologna: Via indipendenza, Piazza Maggiore
 Rome: Piazza Navona
 Modena: Free city center
 Milan: Comune di Milano website
 Cremona: Free city center

Sweden

 Stockholm: Drottninggatan

Oceania

Australia
 Adelaide: Rundle Mall
 Brisbane: Queen Street Mall and Brunswick Street Mall
 Geelong: Geelong city centre
 Melbourne: Bourke Street Mall and Southbank
 New South Wales: Echo Point in the Blue Mountains
 Sydney: Circular Quay, Devonshire Street Subway, Darling Harbour and Pitt Street Mall

New Zealand
 Christchurch: Cathedral Square and the Arts Centre
 Wellington: Cuba Mall
 Auckland: Queen Street, Auckland

See also

Busking Day
:Category:Busking venues
Circus skills
Music Under New York
Skomorokh
Street artist
Street painting
Street theatre

References

 
Lists of entertainment venues
Entertainment lists
+